Exists is a Malaysian pop rock band formed in Johor Bahru, Johor in the end of March 1991. At that time, Exists was known as Exist (without letter 's' at the back) and the original members of this band is Mamat (vocalist), Along (guitarist), Shah (guitarist), Ajai (keyboardist), Musa (bassist) and Ujang (drummer). The band only changed its name to Exists when they release the 4th studio album titled Jangan Gentar in 1997.

The band achieved local fame with the release of their single "Untukmu Ibu", followed by their debut album, Exist (1991). The group followed up with Anugerah (1993). Their next release, Diammu Gunung Berapi (1995), lifted the band within the local music industry. The album, Jangan Gentar, was released in 1997, followed by Mutan in 1998. They took on a new musical style in the following years with their release of Ada (2001), Seperti Dulu (2003) and Paragon (2004).

The band features both hard rock and power ballad musical styles.

Musical groups established in 1991
Malaysian rock music groups